Thurso Football Club are a senior football club from Thurso in Caithness, Scotland. They play in the North Caledonian Football League and are based at Sir George's Park.

History 

The current club was formed in 1998, although there was a previous club playing under the same name formed in the 19th century which later folded. The club are nicknamed "the Vikings" or "the Scab" or sometimes even "the Crabs". 

The club have won a number of honours in their short history, including the North Caledonian League in 1999–00, 2002–03, 2009–10 and 2012–13.

Honours
North Caledonian Football League
Champions: 1999–00, 2002–03, 2009–10, 2012–13
North Caledonian Cup
Winners: 2001–02, 2003–04, 2010–11
Football Times Cup
Winners: 2002–03, 2015–16, 2021–22
Chic Allan Cup
Winners: 2004–05
Jock Mackay Cup
Winners: 2010–11
Morris Newton / SWL Cup
Winners: 2002–03, 2003–04, 2006–07, 2010–11, 2013–14

References

External links
 Official website

Football clubs in Scotland
North Caledonian Football League
North Caledonian Football League teams
Association football clubs established in 1998
1998 establishments in Scotland
Sport in Caithness
Thurso
Football in Highland (council area)